Bernhard Christian Schleep  (4 April 1768 – 27 May 1838) was a land-owning forester and Councillor in Schleswig-Holstein who was a naturalist and collector of natural history specimens. 

Schleep was a son of Johannes Schleep and Maria Christina . He became a councilor in the court of Landgrave Karl von Hessen-Kassel at Gottorf Castle. Along with his friend Johann Casimir Benicken he became a collector of natural history specimens including numerous birds, fish, and mammals. Schleep collaborated with other naturalists including Johann Friedrich Naumann, Christian Ludwig Brehm, Bernhard Meyer and Johann Philipp Achilles Leisler. He had been gifted specimens of polar bear and narwhal by Greenland whalers. A collection of nearly 600 birds was bequeathe to Landgrave Karl and this was later obtained by Frederick VI who donated it to the University of Kiel in 1937. The specimens are now lost but his books are still in the library of the university. C. L. Brehm named "Schleep's rapacious gull", Lestris schleepii, in 1824, a synonym of the Arctic skua. Schleep himself described a form (now subspecies) of the glaucous gull L. h. leuceretes in 1819.

References 

1768 births
1838 deaths
German natural history collectors